Ruppina can refer to:

Ruppina (singer), a J-pop singer also known as "Mai" 
1443 Ruppina, an asteroid discovered in 1937